Surzur is a commune in the Morbihan department of Brittany, in north-western France.

Demographics
Inhabitants of Surzur are called in French Surzurois.

Breton language
In 2008, there was 11,42% of the children attended the bilingual schools in primary education.

See also
Communes of the Morbihan department

References

External links

 Mayors of Morbihan Association 

Communes of Morbihan